Pio H. Laporte (MD) (September 1, 1878 - July 29, 1939) was a Canadian physician and politician in the Province of New Brunswick.

Born in Verchères, Quebec, Pio Laporte studied medicine at Laval University in Quebec City then at the Paris School of Medicine in Paris, France. By 1903, he had made his home in Edmundston, New Brunswick where he practised medicine and was on the staff of the Hôtel-Dieu in nearby Saint-Basile.

Pio Laporte entered municipal politics, serving as president of the local school board and mayor of Edmundston. In 1935 he moved into provincial politics and was elected to the 38th New Brunswick Legislative Assembly as the Liberal Party candidate for the riding of Madawaska County. His Party won power and new Premier Allison Dysart immediately appointed Laporte to his Cabinet as the Minister of Health and Labour.

Doctor Pio Laporte died while in office in 1939 as a result of an automobile accident.

References
 Grenier, Guy. 100 ans de médecine francophone (Multimondes Editions -2002) (French language) 
 Archives of the Religious Hospitallers of Saint Joseph (RHSJ), Saint-Basile, New Brunswick

1878 births
1939 deaths
Université Laval alumni
University of Paris alumni
Physicians from New Brunswick
New Brunswick Liberal Association MLAs
Members of the Executive Council of New Brunswick
People from Verchères, Quebec
Mayors of Edmundston
Road incident deaths in Canada
Accidental deaths in New Brunswick